The 2011 season is New Radiant Sports Club's 32nd year in existence as a football club.

Background 
New Radiant finished at the 4th position of last year's Dhivehi League, as runners-up in FA Cup and 3rd in President's Cup as they were beaten by VB Sports Club in the semi final.

Ali Fasir, Mohamed Jameel and Ahmed Niyaz were some of the biggest signings by the club for the 2011 season.

Kit 
Supplier: MediaNet / Sponsor: Milo

Competitions

Overall

Competition record 

*Draws include knockout matches decided on penalty kicks.

Dhivehi League

League table 

Rules for classification: 1) points; 2) goal difference; 3) number of goals scored.
Updated to games played on 24 September 2011.
Source: RSSSF.com

1 Victory SC qualified for the 2012 AFC Cup as VB Sports Club also won the 2011 Maldives FA Cup.

Matches

FA Cup

President's Cup

References 

 2011 in Maldivian football at RSSSF

New Radiant S.C. seasons